List of Commonwealth Boxing Council champions is a table showing the Commonwealth champions certificated by the Commonwealth Boxing Council (CBC). The CBC is also affiliated with the WBC.

v — Champion vacated title.
s — Champion stripped of title.
(n) — where 'n' is the number of occasions the title has been won.

Light-flyweight

Flyweight

Super-flyweight

Bantamweight

Super-bantamweight

Featherweight

Super-featherweight

Lightweight

Super-lightweight

Welterweight

Super-welterweight

Middleweight

Super-middleweight

Light-heavyweight

Cruiserweight

Heavyweight

See also
British Boxing Board of Control
Commonwealth Boxing Council
List of Commonwealth Boxing Council female champions
List of IBF world champions
List of WBA world champions
List of WBC world champions
List of WBO world champions
World Boxing Council

References

External links
 Commonwealth Boxing Council Official Website

Lists of boxing champions
History of boxing
Professional boxing organizations
Commonwealth sports competitions
Commonwealth of Nations-related lists